Percy Edwards  (1 June 1908 – 7 June 1996) was an English animal impersonator, entertainer and ornithologist.

Biography
As a child, Edwards was fascinated by the wildlife he found in his local area, and by the age of 12 was accomplished enough at imitating many of them that this became his "party piece".

In 1930 he debuted on the BBC radio series Vaudeville, the start of a career that would last the best part of 60 years. During World War II, Edwards worked at Ransomes, Sims & Jefferies in Ipswich.

Edwards became a household name after his animal imitations in the radio shows Ray's a Laugh with Ted Ray, and playing Psyche the dog in the radio series A Life of Bliss. It was said that at the height of his career he could accurately imitate over 600 birds, as well as many other animals. Among other things, he provided the voices for the orcas in Orca (1977), the Reindeer in Santa Claus: The Movie (1985), sheep and bird sounds on Kate Bush's song The Dreaming, and the alien in the film of the same name. Edwards appeared occasionally on BBC TV's pre-school series Play School as a storyteller, in 1967 and from 1973 through 1980. One of his last stage appearances was in the Grand Order of Water Rats centenary show at the London Palladium in 1989.

Edwards was appointed Member of the Order of the British Empire (MBE) in 1993 for services to ornithology and entertainment.

Although he always referred to himself as an entertainer, Edwards was a fellow of the Zoological Society of London, and a respected and published ornithologist.

In 2009, Sir David Attenborough presented a special BBC radio panel game, The Percy Edwards Showdown, dedicated to Edwards's life and career.

He is buried in the churchyard of St Mary's, Polstead, Suffolk.

Filmography
NB: Edwards worked purely as a voice artist unless otherwise stated

1960s
A Life of Bliss (1960, TV Series) - Psyche, fox terrier (voice)
The Deadly Bees (1966) - Tess the Dog (voice, uncredited)

1970s
UFO (1971, TV Series) - (voice)
The Rise and Rise of Michael Rimmer (1970) - Bird impersonator
On the Buses (1971, TV Series) - Bird impressions by (voice)
The Morecambe and Wise Show (1972, TV Series) - Jungle Sounds
The Good Life (1976, TV Series) - Animal Noises (voice)
Ripping Yarns (1977, TV Series) - Frog Noises (uncredited)
The Goodies (1977, TV Series) - The Dodo (voice)
Just William (1977, TV Series) - Parrots (voice)
Orca (1977) - (whale vocalisations) (uncredited)
The Innes Book of Records (1979, TV Series) - Himself
Alien (1979) - (vocal effects for the alien and facehugger)

1980s
Hi-de-Hi! (1981, TV Series) - Bubbles (voice)
The Island of Adventure (1982) - Kiki (voice)
The Plague Dogs (1982) - (various animal vocal effects including Rowf and Snitter's barks) (voice)
The Dark Crystal (1982) - Fizzgig (voice)
Fair Ground! (1983, TV Series) - Captain Cutlass's Voice (voice)
Hilary (1984-1985, TV Series) - Arthur (voice)
Buttercup Buskers (1984) - Narrator
Santa Claus: The Movie (1985) - (voice)
Valhalla (1986) - (Danish version, voice)
Sorry! (1986, TV Series) - The Duck (voice)
Labyrinth (1986) - Ambrosius (voice)

Bibliography
 Call Me at Dawn (1948)
 The Birdman's Pocket Book (1954)
 The Road I Travelled (1979)
 Country Book (c.1980)
 Song Birds (1986)

References

External links

Percy Edwards at the BFI dBase

1908 births
1996 deaths
20th-century British zoologists
Animal impersonators
English ornithologists
Members of the Order of the British Empire
Scientists from Ipswich
Entertainers  from Ipswich
Burials in Suffolk